The Bank of Simpsonville in Simpsonville, Kentucky was listed on the National Register of Historic Places in 1988.  Its building, built c.1902, is located at Third and Railroad Streets in Simpsonville.

It was deemed notable "as a rare surviving example of rural commercial development in [ Shelby ] county for the period. The
building is a prominent visual feature."

References

National Register of Historic Places in Shelby County, Kentucky
Commercial buildings completed in 1902
1902 establishments in Kentucky
Bank buildings on the National Register of Historic Places in Kentucky